Gilling East is a village and civil parish in the Ryedale district of North Yorkshire, England, on the main B1363 road between York and Helmsley,  south of Oswaldkirk and  south of Helmsley. It had a population of 321 at the 2001 Census, which had risen to 345 at the 2011 census. In 2015, North Yorkshire County Council estimated the population to be 360. The village lies in the Howardian Hills just south of the North York Moors National Park and close to Ampleforth Abbey and College.

History
The village is mentioned in the Domesday Book as Ghillinge, and was previously in the wapentake of Ryedale, not the Wapentake of Gilling East, which is now in present-day Richmondshire.

Gilling Castle is on a hill overlooking the village. It began as a towerhouse built by Thomas Etton sometime in the fourteenth century. In 1492, it passed to the Fairfax family and remained in their hands until 1793. Most of the castle we see today dates from their period of occupancy. The village used to have a railway station on the Thirsk and Malton railway, which opened in 1853. A second railway branching north from  railway station went through  and then east to Pickering. The station was closed to passengers in 1953, and closed to goods traffic in 1964.

The local pub, the Fairfax Arms, is at the base of a hill which leads up the drive to Gilling Castle, formerly St Martins Ampleforth, the Prep School for Ampleforth College. The Anglican church in the village is Holy Cross.

There is also a miniature railway in the village operated by the Ryedale Society of Model Engineers. The RSME railway and club house share the site of the old school, now refurbished as Gilling East Village Hall, on Pottergate, a narrow road running west from the main road alongside the Fairfax Arms.

References

External links

Layout of the village

Villages in North Yorkshire
Civil parishes in North Yorkshire